is a Japanese voice actress who is affiliated with Arts Vision. Her best known role is Kiyone Makibi in the Tenchi Muyo! franchise. Other major roles include Asako Nakamura in Ushio and Tora, Keiko Yukimura in YuYu Hakusho, Alcyone in Magic Knight Rayearth, and Lorelei in the Saber Marionette J series. In video games, she voices Mary Argent in Tales of Destiny, Hokuto in Street Fighter EX, Ibuki in Street Fighter III, and Etoile Rosenqueen in the Marl Kingdom series.

Filmography

Anime

Anime films

Video games
{| class="wikitable sortable plainrowheaders"
|+ List of voice performances in video games
! Year
! Series
! Role
! class="unsortable"| Notes
! class="unsortable"| Source
|-
|  || Hatsukoi Monogatari || Forshinia || PC Engine || 
|-
|  || KO Century BEAST Sanjuushi || Zott Suu || PC Engine || 
|-
| –96 || Advanced VG || Ayako Yuuki || PC Engine, PlayStation || 
|-
|  || Tanjou ~Debut~ || Kusunoki Shinobu || PC Engine, Sega Saturn || 
|-
|  || Startling Odyssey II Maryuu Sensou || Patricia Hyneld || PC-Engine || 
|-
|  || Digital Ange || Foltjunia || PC98, PC Engine || 
|-
| –95 || Magic Knight Rayearth || Alcyone || Sega Saturn, others || 
|-
|  || Tenchi Muyo! Ryo-Ohki || Kiyone || PC-FX ||  
|-
|  || Power Dolls 2 || Lisa Kim || PlayStation ||  
|-
|  || Rapyulus Panic || Namie || Sega Saturn ||  
|-
|  || Angel Graffiti Anata e no Profile || Amano Misuzu || PlayStation || 
|-
|  || Harukaze Sentai V Force || Aoi Kagetsu || PlayStation || 
|-
|  ||  Street Fighter EX series ||  Hokuto || ||
|-
|  || Lightning Legend: Daigo no Daibouken || Misa Atago, Risa Atago || PlayStation ||  
|-
|  || Fire Woman Matoigumi || Seta Hiromi  || PC FX  || 
|-
|  || Marika Shinjitsu no Sekai || Oruga || Sega Saturn || 
|-
|  || Next King Koi no Sennen Okoku || Anice || PlayStation || 
|-
|  || Bulk Slash || Riizen Lavia || Sega Saturn || 
|-
|  || Super Robot Wars F || Rain || PlayStation, Sega Saturn || 
|-
|  || Mahō Gakuen Lunar! || Palea || Sega Saturn || 
|-
|  || Galaxy Fräulein Yuna 3: Lightning Angel || Raika || Sega Saturn || 
|-
|  || Tales of Destiny || Mary Argent || PlayStation || 
|-
|  || Arunamu no Tsubasa || Mayukoda || PlayStation  || 
|-
|  || Street Fighter III series || Ibuki || Arcade ||  
|-
|  || Yuukyuu Gensoukyoku 2nd Album || Eve Callagher || PlayStation, Sega Saturn || 
|-
|  || EVE The Lost One || Suzuta Natsumi || Sega Saturn  || 
|-
|  || Zoku Hatsukoi Monogatari || Iwadate Maki || PC FX || 
|-
|  || Super Robot Wars F Final || Rain || PlayStation || 
|-
|  || Sōkaigi || Hifumi Sudo || ||
|-
|  || Lupin Sanse Pyramid no Kenja Lupin the Third and the Mystery of the Pyramid  || Princess of Twilight  || ||
|-
|  || Nijiiro Twinkle: Guruguru Dai-sakusen || Cleardonny || PS, Windows || 
|-
|  || Advanced VG 2 || Ayako Yuuki || PlayStation || 
|-
|  || Rhapsody: A Musical Adventure || Etoile Rosenqueen || PlayStation || 
|-
|  || Thousand Arms || Jeala || PlayStation || 
|-
|  || Device Reign || Utsuki Riko || PlayStation, Sega Saturn || 
|-
|  || Sonata ||  Oozone Chihaya || PlayStation || 
|-
|  || Cyber Formula Aratanaru Chousensha || Kyoko Aoi || PlayStation || 
|-
|  || Little Princess: Marl Ōkoku no Ningyō Hime 2 || Etoile Rosenqueen, Ran Ran || PlayStation, PlayStation Network || 
|-
|  || Skies of Arcadia || Belleza || Dreamcast  || 
|-
|  || Sakura Taisen 3 || Nadel || Dreamcast ||  
|-
|  || Valkyrie Profile 2: Silmeria || Chrystie, Crescent, Lwyn, Lydia, Phyress, Sha-Kon ||  || 
|-
|}

Audio dramas

 My Codename is Charmer (Kaede Saginomori)
 Dengeki Bunko Best Game Selection7 Fire Emblem Tabidachi no Sho'' (Sheeda)

Dubbing

Discography

Albums
 Fairy
 Water Lily

References

External links
  
 

1966 births
Living people
Arts Vision voice actors
Japanese video game actresses
Japanese voice actresses
Voice actresses from Kyoto
20th-century Japanese actresses
21st-century Japanese actresses